Miklós Fodor (3 September 1908 – 30 April 1997) was a Hungarian field handball player who competed in the 1936 Summer Olympics. He was part of the Hungarian field handball team, which finished fourth in the Olympic tournament. He played four matches.

References

External links
profile

1908 births
1997 deaths
Field handball players at the 1936 Summer Olympics
Hungarian male handball players
Olympic handball players of Hungary